Sonneratia is a genus of plants in the family Lythraceae.  Formerly the Sonneratia were placed in a family called Sonneratiaceae which included both the Sonneratia and the Duabanga, but these two are now placed in their own monotypic subfamilies of the family Lythraceae.  The genus was also named Blatti by James Edward Smith, but Sonneratia had botanical nomenclature priority. Sonneratia species are mangrove trees. The germination is viviparous.

Species
The genus Sonneratia has the following species:

Sonneratia alba Sm.
Sonneratia apetala Banks
Sonneratia caseolaris (L.) Engl.
Sonneratia griffithii Kurz
Sonneratia × gulngai N.C.Duke
Sonneratia × hainanensis W.C.Ko, E.Y.Chen & W.Y.Chen
Sonneratia lanceolata Blume
Sonneratia ovata Backer
Sonneratia × urama N.C.Duke

See also 
Mangroves

References

Graham, S. A., Thorne & Reveal (May 1998) "Validation of subfamily names in Lythraceae" Taxon 47(2): pp. 435–436;
 Shi, Suhua et al. (September 2000) "Phylogenetic Analysis of the Sonneratiaceae and its Relationship to Lythraceae Based on ITS Sequences of nrDNA" Journal of Plant Research 113(3):  pp. 253–258;
 Duke, N. C. and Jackes, Betsy R. (1987) "A Systematic Revision of the Mangrove Genus Sonneratia (Sonneratiaceae) in Australasia" Blumea 32: pp. 277–302 - from Internet Archive;

External links

Mangrove Apple (Sonneratia alba)  from Mangrove and Wetland Wildlife at Sungei Buloh Nature Park - retrieved 3 November 2017.

 
Lythraceae genera